Mirko Vinces (January 11, 1914 – July 17, 1944) was a Yugoslav sprint canoeist who competed in the late 1930s.

He finished 11th in the folding K-1 10000 m event at the 1936 Summer Olympics in Berlin.

References
Mirko Vincens' profile at Sports Reference.com

1914 births
1944 deaths
Canoeists at the 1936 Summer Olympics
Olympic canoeists of Yugoslavia
Yugoslav male canoeists